Enigma Records (also known as Enigma Entertainment Corporation) was a popular rock and alternative American record label in the 1980s.

History
Enigma Records launched as a division of Greenworld Distribution, an independent music importer/distributor, in 1981. Four years later, in 1985, Enigma severed ties with Greenworld and became its own company. Enigma was initially located in Torrance, California, then El Segundo, California and finally Culver City, California. Enigma was founded and run by brothers William and Wesley Hein. Jim Martone joined the company in 1984. Enigma focused on punk rock, alternative, and heavy metal music though it also released techno (Synthicide Records), jazz (Intima Records) and classical music (Enigma Classics) through subsidiary labels.

The label's first release was Mötley Crüe's Too Fast for Love. The album was initially released under the band's own Leathür Records imprint but manufactured, marketed and distributed by what would become the Enigma Records team. After the band moved on to Elektra Records, the Enigma Records name was adopted and all subsequent artists were released under this new name. Enigma's next major success was with the pop band Berlin.

Enigma Records was initially distributed through independent record importers/distributors such as Jem Records and Important Records. In 1984, Enigma entered into a joint venture with EMI America to sign and develop new artists. Among the artists signed under the venture were the Red Hot Chili Peppers and SSQ (later renamed Stacey Q and signed to Atlantic Records).  In 1986, Enigma moved its distribution to Capitol/EMI, a major record label, while leaving its Restless Records division with the independent distributors that had previously distributed Enigma. Poison, a glam rock band, and The Smithereens were two of the first artists released under the joint Enigma / Capitol relationship, both of which had significant success. That same year it launched a music video line, which was also distributed by Capitol.

One of Enigma's biggest commercial successes was with the Christian rock band Stryper, which had several gold and platinum records on the label as well as significant international success.

In addition to the primary Enigma Records label, the company had two smaller subsidiary labels as well as a music publishing company (La Rana / El Porto Music administered by Bug Music). Enigma Retro focused on re-issues of material licensed from other labels such as Straight Records, Bizarre Records, and DiscReet Records. The Restless Records division focused on alternative artists not intended for major label distribution. Enigma also released film soundtracks including The Terminator and River's Edge. Enigma released a compilation album, Enigma Variations, with various artists. Enigma had a joint venture with Mute Records and released certain Mute titles in the United States. Sonic Youth's landmark 1988 album Daydream Nation was originally released on Enigma Records, in association with Blast First Records.

Enigma was formally acquired by Capitol/EMI in 1989. Some of its catalog and operations were merged into the still independent Restless Records in 1991.

Enigma's Canadian division was closed in 1992 and was reorganized into FRE Records before shuttering in 1999, after which its back catalogs was sold to DROG Records.

The Enigma catalog is controlled by Capitol Music Group, owned by Universal Music Group which acquired Capitol's former parent EMI and the majority of its recorded music operations in 2012. Disney Music Group's Hollywood Records, distributed by UMG, handles the reissues of Stryper's Enigma albums. The catalog of Devo's albums and Enigma titles that were merged into Restless is owned by Warner Music Group, which acquired Restless's previous parent Rykodisc in 2006, and distributed by the Alternative Distribution Alliance.

Artists

7 Seconds
20/20
45 Grave
Agent Orange
Bardeux
Barren Cross
Battalion of Saints
Berlin
David Cassidy
Casteel
Celtic Frost
Channel 3
Close Lobsters
The Cramps
Dead Milkmen
Death Angel
The Descendents
Devo
The Dickies
Don Dixon
The Effigies
Roky Erickson
Fear
The Fibonaccis
Game Theory
Get Smart!
GG Allin
Girlschool
Great White
Green on Red
Guardian
Peter Hammill
Allan Holdsworth
Hurricane
Hüsker Dü
Jon and the Nightriders
Steve Kilbey
Lȧȧz Rockit
Laibach
The Leaving Trains
Lizzy Borden
The Minutemen
Ronnie Montrose
Mojo Nixon
Mötley Crüe
Motörhead
Bill Nelson
Obsession
Pere Ubu
Plan 9
Plasticland
Poison
Chris Poland
Rain Parade
Ratt
Red Flag
Red Hot Chili Peppers
Redd Kross
The Residents
Sacred Reich
Greg Sage
Skid Roper
Saxon
Screamin' Sirens
Shooting Star
Slayer
The Smithereens
Sonic Youth
Al Stewart
Stryper
Tex and the Horseheads
They Might Be Giants
Thor
Tom Peterson and Another Language
T.S.O.L.
The U-Krew
Untouchables
The Vandals
Ben Vaughn
Vinnie Vincent Invasion
Voivod
Wall of Voodoo
Wednesday Week
Wild Dogs
Ike Willis
Wire
XYZ
Znowhite

See also
List of record labels

References

 
Alternative rock record labels
Classical music record labels
Defunct companies based in Greater Los Angeles
Defunct record labels of the United States
Rock record labels
EMI
1980 establishments in California
1991 disestablishments in California
Record labels disestablished in 1991
Record labels based in California
Techno record labels